Novosilski Glacier is a glacier, 8 miles (13 km) long and 2 miles (3.2 km) wide, flowing in a westerly direction from the southwest slopes of the Salvesen Range to Novosilski Bay on the south coast of South Georgia. First surveyed and named by a German expedition 1928–29, under Kohl-Larsen. The name derives from nearby Novosilski Bay.

See also
 List of glaciers in the Antarctic
 Glaciology

References

Glaciers of South Georgia